The fifth season of Ídolos aired in 2012. João Manzarra and Cláudia Vieira were the presenters.

Live shows

Top 14 – Their Personal Idols
Débora Teixeira, Paulo Marques, Pablo Oliveira and Solange Muxanga left the competition in this semi-finals round. Now, the Top 10 is found.

Wild Card

 Group performance: "Mambo No. 5"

Top 10 – 21st century
André Abrantes is the first finalist leaving the competition and André Cruz was in the bottom 2 with him.

Top 9 – 80's Portuguese Music
Mónica Mendes leaves the show, in a sad elimination. Alongside her, João Santos and Teresa Queirós were in the bottom 3.

Top 8 – The Beatles
Catarina Almada is eliminated. For the second week in a row, Teresa Queirós is in the bottom 2.

Top 7 (first week) – Songs from the Movies
João Santos was the contestant with the fewest votes, but the judges decided to save him and with that, the following week two people will go home. Inês Herédia and Mariana Domingues were shockingly in the bottom 3, both for the first time.

Top 7 (second week) – Great Portuguese Hits
Inês Herédia and Margarida Carriço were eliminated. André Cruz was once again in the bottom 3. The first name revealed was Margarida Carriço's, but was never told that she had been the person with the fewest votes. Margarida Carriço was probably the most shocking elimination, because she was in the Top 5, in the first live show, and she had never been in the bottom 2 or 3 until her elimination.

Top 5 – Viewers' Choice and Judges' Choice
From this point on, every contestant sings two songs. Teresa Queirós was eliminated, which is not a big shock, because she had been in the bottom twice before. André Cruz was in the bottom 2 in his third time.

Top 4 – Great Successes 
João Santos was eliminated, three weeks after the judges save. Shockingly, André Cruz was in the Top 2 with Mariana Domingues and for the first time ever Diogo Piçarra is in the bottom 2 with João.

Top 3 – 3 Songs, 3 Languages 
André Cruz is eliminated. The presenters revealed that Mariana was in the final, which meant that Diogo and André were the bottom 2.

Top 2 – Finale 
Diogo Piçarra wins the competition, after being in the bottom 2 in the last two weeks. Mariana Domingues takes the second place.

Elimination chart

References

Season 05
2012 Portuguese television seasons